Moussa Dagnogo (born 30 January 1982) is a French former professional footballer who played as a striker. He formerly worked as head coach of Carmel United Soccer Club. He is currently coaching premier and elite players at Jacksonville FC

Playing career
Dagnogo was born in Paris. He signed for Scottish club St Mirren as a trialist in February 2001, and scored the winning goal on his debut against Dundee. He was subsequently signed on a permanent contract. Dagnogo had a trial with Scottish Football League side, Clyde in December 2002.

Coaching career
In 2009, Dagnogo became the coach of Carmel United Soccer Club in Carmel, IN. At Carmel he had great success, leading  his teams to strong runs at the state championship. From 2004 - 2011, he coached youth players in Indiana most recently at Carmel United Soccer Club. In 2010, Moussa’s U15 Girls won the State Cup.  While at FC Pride, his U12 & U15 Girls were State Cup Semi-finalists.
Moussa has also been Assistant Coach for Men’s & Women’s teams at St Joseph University.
Moussa holds the National C Coaching License.

In May 2011, Dagnogo relocated to Jacksonville, Florida and began coaching at the long established Jacksonville Youth Soccer Club. He assisted in training various teams and players, and was head coach of the Under 16 Boys FURY team. Under Dagnogo's leadership the team steadily climbed in state rankings and performed well in several tournaments in the Southeastern US.

Dagnogo coached at a local high school in Jacksonville, FL from 2011 to 2013.  During his tenure as head coach at Christ's Church Academy, he led his team to the divisional championships 3 straight years, and to the regional championships in his final season.  

Dagnogo then left to coach at the Jacksonville Football Club. In the 2015–16 season he was head coach of the Under 14 Boys Armada, leading them to the Quarterfinals in State cupand the Final of Florida Cup.

References

1982 births
Living people
Footballers from Paris
French sportspeople of Ivorian descent
Association football forwards
French footballers
Scottish Premier League players
A-League (1995–2004) players
USL Second Division players
USL League Two players
US Sénart-Moissy players
Angoulême Charente FC players
Racing Club de France Football players
Knattspyrnufélag Reykjavíkur players
Red Star F.C. players
Saint-Colomban Sportive Locminé players
Bristol Rovers F.C. players
St Mirren F.C. players
Indiana Blast players
Cincinnati Kings players
Indianapolis Braves players
French expatriate footballers
Expatriate footballers in England
French expatriate sportspeople in England
Expatriate footballers in Scotland
French expatriate sportspeople in Scotland
Expatriate footballers in Portugal
French expatriate sportspeople in Portugal
Expatriate footballers in Iceland
French expatriate sportspeople in Iceland
Expatriate soccer players in the United States
French expatriate sportspeople in the United States